Country, God or the Girl is the fourth studio album by Somali-Canadian hip hop artist K'naan. It was released worldwide on October 16, 2012.

Background and development
The album was first announced in February 2012, with a release date of May 1, 2012. Coinciding with the announcement, he confirmed that he has collaborated with Nas, U2 lead singer Bono, Keith Richards of The Rolling Stones, American hip-hop and electronic artist and producer will.i.am and Canadian singer-songwriter Nelly Furtado.

Release and promotion

Singles
"Is Anybody Out There?" was released as the lead single from More Beautiful Than Silence. It features vocals from Nelly Furtado. The song was released as a promotional single in the United States in early January, and as a single worldwide on January 24, 2011. The single made its chart debut on the Canadian Hot 100 at #67, before peaking at #14. It notably topped the New Zealand charts and peaked at #92 on the Billboard Hot 100.

"Nothing to Lose", featuring American hip-hop artist Nas, was released as the second single from More Beautiful Than Silence on February 1, 2012.

"Hurt Me Tomorrow" was released as the album's first official single on May 1, 2012, notably the album's original release date. It peaked at #12 on the Canadian Hot 100 and at #37 on the Billboard 40 Pop Songs

Critical reception
Country, God or the Girl received generally positive reviews from music critics. At Metacritic, which assigns a normalized rating out of 100 to reviews from mainstream critics, the album received an average score of 74, based on 5 reviews, which indicates "generally favorable reviews". K'naan wrote an op-ed criticizing himself and his attempts to make the album more palatable for American audiences.

Track listing

Personnel 

Personnel
Engineering – Smith Carlson

References

2012 albums
K'naan albums
A&M Octone Records albums
Albums produced by Chuck Harmony
Albums produced by RedOne
Albums produced by Ryan Tedder
Albums produced by Jon Levine